Palos of the Dog Star Pack is a science fiction novel by American writer John Ulrich Giesy.  It was first published in book form in 1965 by Avalon Books.  The novel was originally serialized in five parts in the magazine All-Story Weekly beginning in July 1918.

Plot summary
Set on the planet Palos, the novel concerns Jason Croft, a wealthy American who has learned the art of astral projection from a Hindu teacher.  Croft feels an unusual calling to Sirius, the Dog Star, and projects his consciousness there, eventually finding his way to the major planet of the solar system, Palos.  Once there, Croft finds human life, and floats among them observing their lives. He falls in love at first sight with the princess Naia, and determines to win her love.  He eventually finds a host body in the form of the "spiritually sick" Jasor of Nodhur.  Within Jasor's body, Croft sets out to win the love of the princess, by introducing technological improvements to the rulers of her kingdom, Tamarizia.  Because of the knowledge gained by astrally spying upon key figures and places on Palos, the people view him as an "angel" of sorts, sent by their deity Zitu.  Croft uses this misunderstanding to explain his knowledge of advanced technology.

External links

Page at Internet Speculative Fiction Database

1965 American novels
American science fiction novels
Novels first published in serial form
Works originally published in Argosy (magazine)
Avalon Books books